Kirkpatrick is a surname and occasional given name. It may also refer to:

United States 

 Kirkpatrick, Indiana
 Kirkpatrick, Ohio, a village
 Kirkpatrick, Oregon, a census-designated place
 Kirkpatrick Chapel (the Sophia Astley Kirkpatrick Memorial Chapel), a college chapel located at Rutgers University in New Brunswick, New Jersey

United Kingdom 

 Kirkpatrick-Fleming, Scotland
 Kirkpatrick railway station

Antarctica 

 Mount Kirkpatrick